Parco Giardino Sigurtà is a natural park of 60 hectars in the town of Valeggio sul Mincio, in the Veneto region of Italy. Among its features are 600,000 square meters of lawns and woods, a million tulips and 30,000 roses, 18 ponds and lakes, a maze and a 400 year-old oak. It was ranked as second best park in Europe in 2015, prize awarded by the European Garden Heritage Network.

References 

Parks in Veneto
Protected areas established in 1978
1978 establishments in Italy